Bob Sharp (born March 11, 1939) is an American former racing driver and owner of Bob Sharp Racing. Bob is the
father of Scott Sharp, an American professional racing driver, who is best known for his years as a competitor in the Indy Racing League.

Between 1967 and 1975, Sharp won the Sports Car Club of America national championships six times, (in B-Sedan, F-Production and C-Production) and the IMSA GTU title, racing for Datsun, whose cars he also sold.  One of his main motivations to campaign Datsuns  was, he said, "You race cars to sell cars."  His success with racing drove his Connecticut dealership to go from selling 200 Datsuns per year to selling 2000.

In 1960, after serving in the Army and while attending college, Bob began
racing his 1960 Austin-Healey "bug-eye" Sprite, in spite of
it being his "daily driver" used to go back and forth to school.  While his time at Nichols College was wrapping up, his racing and Datsun owner's club started earning him customers from Boston to Philadelphia, with the dealership becoming known for its racing-inspired attention to detail.

Bob, who was the premier Datsun racer on the East Coast, introduced Paul Newman to competitive driving in 1971. By the following year, Newman joined Bob Sharp Racing, driving one of Bob's 510 B-sedans, and they spent many weekdays at Lime Rock Park discussing racing, while Paul got comfortable with the new Datsun car.

SCCA National Championship Runoffs

External links
The Story of Bob Sharp & Bob Sharp Racing

References

American racing drivers
SCCA National Championship Runoffs winners
Living people
Nichols College alumni
1939 births